Clonopsis is a stick insect genus in the family Bacillidae.  Species have been recorded from mainland Europe and North Africa.

Species
 Clonopsis algerica (Pantel, 1890) - type species (as Bacillus algericus Pantel)
 Clonopsis felicitatis Scali & Milani, 2009
 Clonopsis gallica (Charpentier, 1825)
 Clonopsis maroccana Bullini & Nascetti, 1987
 Clonopsis soumiae Scali & Milani, 2009

References

External links 
 

Phasmatodea genera
Insects described in 1915